Rachel Molly Hamilton aka Big Rachel (1829 - 1899) was an Irish-born woman who was a special constable during the Partick Riots in Glasgow in 1875.

Early life 
Hamilton was born in Ireland, later living in Partick, Glasgow in Scotland with her husband. She held a variety of jobs considered unusual for women at the time, including working as a labourer in Tod and Macgregor's shipyard, as a forewoman navvy in the brickworks at Jordanhill, and as a farm labourer.

The Partick riots 
The Partick riots started on 6 August 1875, the centenary of Daniel O'Connell's birth, and lasted for three days. The Irish immigrants decided to celebrate O'Connell's birth with a march and other Glaswegians rose up in protest. Partick's population expanded by over 50% during the 1870s, from 17,700 to 27,400. The centre of what was said to be a major civil disturbance was at Partick Cross. Partick was responsible for its own policing as a police burgh. Hamilton was one of around 30 locals sworn in as special constables, who were responsible for driving the rioters back.

Her story is now included as part of a walking tour run by Glasgow Women's Library that highlights notable local women.

References 

1829 births
1899 deaths
19th-century Scottish people
19th-century Scottish women
19th-century Irish people
19th-century Irish women
People from Partick